John Lovett (May 6, 1877 – December 5, 1937) was a professional baseball player who played pitcher in the Major Leagues in 1903 for the St. Louis Cardinals.

Born in Monday, Ohio, Lovett was 26 years old when he broke into the big leagues on May 22, 1903, with the Cardinals.

References

External links

1877 births
1937 deaths
Major League Baseball pitchers
St. Louis Cardinals players
Baseball players from Ohio
Dayton Old Soldiers players
People from Hocking County, Ohio